Kiriwina is the largest of the Trobriand Islands, with an area of 290.5 km². It is part of the Milne Bay Province of Papua New Guinea. Most of the 12,000 people who live in the Trobriands live on Kiriwina. The Kilivila language, also known as Kiriwina, is spoken on the island. The main town is Losuia. The island falls under the administrative division of Kiriwina Rural LLG.

History

Allied forces landed on Kiriwina and Woodlark Island on June 30, 1943 during Operation Chronicle in World War II. Following the landing U.S. Army Engineers supervised construction of Kiriwina Airfield, including a 2,000 metre (6,000 ft) coral-surfaced runway. 

"In September 1943, at the request of the 6th Army, 12 officers and 306 men of the 60th Naval Construction Battalion were sent to Kiriwina to assist in the airfield development.  The primary task of the Seabees was the construction of two taxiways, one 7,000 feet long, with 25 fighter hardstands; the other, 5,300 feet long, with 16 bomber hardstands. The first taxiway was completed on October 12, two days ahead of schedule, in time to support a major air raid against Rabaul. About a week later, the second taxiway was completed." No. 73 Wing RAAF was based at this field in August 1943.

A seaplane base was constructed at Losuia, consisting of an anchorage and jetty.

21st century 
30 people were killed in tribal warfare on Kiriwina in October 2022.

See also

 Mokita

References

External links
 pacificwrecks.com

Trobriand Islands
Islands of Milne Bay Province